3 + 3 is the eleventh album released by the Isley Brothers for the Epic label under their T-Neck imprint on August 7, 1973. In 2020, the album was ranked at 464 on Rolling Stone 500 Greatest Albums of All Time list.

Background
Their first album for the label after several years on Buddah Records, it was also the first time the family group, which had consisted of founding members O'Kelly Isley, Jr., Rudolph Isley and Ronald Isley, officially included six members instead of the standard three. Following the recording and release of Brother, Brother, Brother (1972) the previous year, this was the first album to officially include younger brothers Ernie and Marvin and in-law Chris Jasper, even though all three had played on the previous several albums.

The success of the album is attributed to their first Top 10 pop record since "It's Your Thing" (1969), with their own cover of the self-penned "Who's That Lady", now re-titled "That Lady, Pt. 1 & 2". Other hit singles included the top five R&B single "What It Comes Down To", and their cover of Seals & Crofts' folk hit "Summer Breeze" (1972), which was also a top ten R&B single. The album became their first platinum album.

The Isley Brothers recorded 3 + 3 in the Record Plant at the same time as Stevie Wonder was recording Innervisions (1973). In fact, they walked in on him recording "Don't You Worry 'bout a Thing". Both Chris Jasper of the Isley Brothers and Stevie Wonder were users of the ARP synthesizer and both worked with visionary engineers Robert Margouleff and Malcolm Cecil.

In addition to a stereo record release, this album was mixed in quadraphonic and released in 1974 on SQ record: T-NECK PZQ – 32453. It was also released on Super Audio CD on December 4, 2001.

The album was remastered and expanded for inclusion in the 2015 23-CD box set The RCA Victor & T-Neck Album Masters (1959-1983).

Reception 
The album was included in the book 1001 Albums You Must Hear Before You Die  and is listed number 992 in All-Time Top 1000 Albums (3rd. edition, 2000). In 2020, the album was ranked at 464 on Rolling Stone 500 Greatest Albums of All Time list.

Track listing
Unless otherwise noted, Information taken from AllMusic and based on album liner notes.

Personnel

The Isley Brothers
Ronald Isley – lead vocals, background vocals 
Rudolph Isley – background vocals
O'Kelly Isley Jr. – background vocals
Ernie Isley – background vocals (1, 6, 8), maracas (6), tom-toms (6), acoustic guitar, electric guitar, 12-string guitar
Marvin Isley – background vocals (1, 6, 8), bass guitar
Chris Jasper – background vocals (1, 6, 8), Hohner clavinet (3, 5–7), Moog synthesizer (8-9), ARP synthesizer, acoustic piano, electric piano, tambourine

Guest musicians
George Moreland – drums (1-3, 5–7), tom-toms (6)
Truman Thomas – organ (1, 3–6)
Rocky – congas (1)

Production and design
Produced by Ronald Isley, Rudolph Isley & O'Kelly Isley Jr.
Malcolm Cecil, Robert Margouleff – recording engineers
Ed Lee – cover design
Don Hunstein – photography

Charts

Weekly charts

Singles

References

External links 
 The Isley Brothers - 3 + 3 (1973) album releases & credits at Discogs
 The Isley Brothers - 3 + 3 (1973) album to be listened as stream on Spotify

1973 albums
Albums recorded at Record Plant (Los Angeles)
Epic Records albums
The Isley Brothers albums
T-Neck Records albums